Ancient Mechanisms is the 4th album by LV, which was created in collaboration with Tigran Hamasyan and was released 9 October 2015. LV is a duo of Si Williams and Will Horrocks, who met when they were both studying at University College London. Critics said that Tigran and LV did not gel well together, leaving the music sounding disjointed. LV and Tigran first met when they were performing at a Maida Vale session in 2012 for Gilles Peterson's final BBC Radio 1 show.

Track listing

References 

2015 albums
Brownswood Recordings albums
Tigran Hamasyan albums